Together (literally "When We Are Together") is a Singaporean Chinese drama produced in 2009. It was telecasted on Singapore's free-to-air channel, MediaCorp Channel 8. It stars Jeanette Aw, Dai Xiangyu,  Elvin Ng, Eelyn Kok, Zhang Zhenhuan and Zhou Ying as the casts for the series. It is MediaCorp's 46th anniversary year-end blockbuster drama, and was sponsored by the Media Development Authority of Singapore. It made its debut on 30 November 2009 and ended on 18 January 2010. This drama serial consists of 36 episodes, and was screened on every weekday night at 9:00 pm.

The series title also refers to the children's folk song "The More We Get Together" and the tune is played during the interlude and in the introduction of the theme song. Together reran at 5.30pm on Channel 8 on weekdays and 4.30pm on weekends and is currently on weekends at 7.30am.

Cast

Yao Family

Lin Family

Huang Family

Qin Family

Wang Family

Dance Club

North Bridge Road shops

Police Station

Others

Plot

The story begins in 1967. That year, Singapore first issued her own currency and made national service mandatory for all young Singaporean males who have come of age. That year, there were people who rented out fake eyelashes for S$4 a day; prices of eggs plummeted to a new low, propelling Singaporeans to start a movement to kill chickens to reduce egg-supply. That year, the “Vietnam Rose” (a form of syphilis) set foot on the island, visitors who called on prostitutes shuddered at its mention; that same year, Sakura and Rita Chao's “New Peach-blossom River” was popular in the streets of Singapore...

There lived 3 families in 3 houses along a horizontal street (which bustled with noise and excitement) in North Bridge Road, amongst whom were 6 youths of about the same age and had grown up together. Lin Xiaobei (Dai Xiangyu) was the only son of tailor Lin. He fought and got into trouble all the time, and was a constant headache to his neighbours. Yao Jianhong (Jeanette Aw), who grew up with Xiaobei, was the only person who could subdue him. Jianhong withdrew from school at a young age and with her father, performed martial arts in the streets to sell medicated ointment. She was in the ‘turf’ for years, and was a candid and forthright girl with a sense of chivalry. Lin Xiaobei liked her and the feeling was mutual. However she was very unhappy with Xiao Bei's frivolous attitude. She hoped that Xiao Bei would be down-to-earth and succeed his father's trade. Xiaobei did not want to be resigned to cooping in the humble tailor-shop. He wanted to venture into more ambitious grounds and strike it rich someday.

Another childhood friend of Lin Xiaobei was Huang Zhihao, nicknamed "Tarzan"(Elvin Ng), who was always building castles in the air. A fickle-minded youth, he wanted to be a car racer for a moment and fantasized about being a wrestler next. Both of them were at loggerheads sometimes and allies during other occasions. Xiaobei and Tarzan stick by each other through weal and woe. Like chopsticks, each is incomplete without the other.

Besides Jianhong, Tarzan's sister, Huang Jinhao (Eelyn Kok), also liked Xiaobei. She was a vain and materialistic girl with a naive mindset. Despite not winning Xiaobei's heart, she was loyal to him as a friend. Jianhong's twin brother, Yao Wuji (Zhang Zhenhuan) was very timid. He could only keep the feelings he had towards Jinhao to himself.

Qin Hui Min (Zhou Ying) was the only one among the few youngsters who was highly educated. Though she was physically weak, she had an unrelenting perseverance, and eventually became a lawyer.

The two generations of these families went through 30 years of changes, entwined in love, hate, grudge, jealousy, magnanimity and forgiveness.

Character analysis

Dai Xiangyu as Lin Xiaobei – Lin Xiaobei is an eloquent, ambitious, strong and silent, upholding justice, dare to love, dare to hate and is the only son. There are a total of three women who is in love with him however his eyes are set on only Jianhong.  His fate later had a tremendous change because of Huang Jinhao going from a happy go lucky chap to a drug addict. He later found out his lover had married his best friend. Xiaobei was also given a nickname as Xiaomei.
Jeanette Aw as Yao Jianhong – Yao Jianhong is a beautiful, strong girl who can pull through even the darkest period of time. She never receive any education and helps her father to perform martial arts on the street，later she became a bar girl to help her father pay his debts. She is in love with Xiaobei but she wants him to be realistic and stop being so ambitious，however he left her due to some reasons. She later was pregnant with Xiaobei's child yet married Zhihao.
Elvin Ng as Huang Zhihao –  As ‘Tarzan’ in the drama, he is someone who is brash and courageous, but naive.  Often manipulated by others, he is easily distracted and does not succeed in the things he takes up. He harbors big ambitions but easily gives up in the face of difficulties. Tarzan is great buddies with Xiao Bei but falls out with him because of their love for Jianhong. He eventually marries Jian Hong but never wins her heart.
Eelyn Kok as Huang Jinhao – She plays Huang Jinhao, a vain young girl in her prime whose bubbly, pretty and fashionable.  Always dreaming of a better life, she does not want to be cooped up working in a coffeeshop. Naive, she is often lucky to have Xiaobei who protects her from being cheated.  She makes use of Yao Wuji who's in love with her, and fights with Jianhong for Xiaobei's affections. She later becomes the cause of Xiaobei's downward spiral change of fate.
Zhang Zhenhuan as Yao Wuji – He plays an introvert, shy, non-ambitious Yao Jianhong's brother who falls for Huang Jinhao. Jinhao makes use of Wuji to get what she wants.
Zhou Ying as Qin Huimin – she plays an easily fallen ill lawyer and quietly falling in love with Xiaobei but when she finds out about his love for Jianhong, she even tries to bring them together despite being still in love with Xiaobei.

Awards and nominations

Together was nominated for 20 awards in the 2010 Star Awards, and became the biggest winner with five awards, including the Best Drama Series and Theme Song. The show went on to nominate for three more awards in the Asian Television Award, but did not win any.

Star Awards 2010

Trivia
Fiona Xie was originally cast as Huang Jinhao, however the role was instead given to Eelyn Kok after Xie pulled out last minute due to personal reasons.
A majority of the scenes were filmed in Malacca.
Scripts of Jeanette Aw was originally written to love Elvin Ng.
Yuan Long has two names, Zhang and Yang, with the latter called more.
Together was initially planned to have 35 episodes, but later extended to 36 due to filming overrun.
 The TV serial was featured as material for television broadcasting for other drama series such as in episodes 4 and 7 of C.L.I.F. 2 and in episode 10 of 118.
 Desmond Tan's first villainous role.

Overseas release
Together was broadcast on PPCTV Channel 9 as a blockbuster drama series of the year.

See also
List of Together episodes

References

External links
Official Drama website
谢宛谕辞演大制作 揣测四起
谢宛谕经理人：辞演是因私人原因
郭蕙雯顶替谢宛谕
Eelyn Kok fills in for Fiona Xie in 'Together'
《当我们同在一起》精彩片段抢先看
戴阳天承认 对欧萱日久生情

17 minutes sneak preview
Watch here

Singapore Chinese dramas
2009 Singaporean television series debuts
2010 Singaporean television series endings
Channel 8 (Singapore) original programming